N,N-Dimethyllysergamide or ''N,N''-dimethyl-D-lysergamide (DAM-57) is a derivative of ergine. There has been a single report of observing N,N-dimethyl-D-lysergamide in the illicit drug market. This compound did induce autonomic disturbances at oral levels of some ten times the dosage required for LSD, presumably in the high hundreds of micrograms. There is some disagreement as to whether there were psychic changes observed.

References

Lysergamides